Tamuning, also known as Tamuning-Tumon-Harmon is a village located on the western shore of the United States territory of Guam.  The village of Tamuning is the economic center of Guam, containing tourist center Tumon, Harmon Industrial Park, and other commercial districts. Its central location along Marine Corps Drive, the island's main thoroughfare, has aided in its development.

Tamuning is the site of the access roads and the old passenger terminal of Antonio B. Won Pat International Airport, the passenger airport for Guam. Fort Juan Muña, in Harmon, is a facility for the Guam Army National Guard.

The present and former locations of Guam Memorial Hospital, Guam's only civilian and government operated hospital, are in Tamuning. With Guam's only private birthing center also in the village, most modern civilian births on Guam take place in Tamuning.

Etymology 

The ancient Chamorro word for Tamuning was Apurgan or Apotgan. "Tamuning" is a Carolinian word that was given to the area where Carolinians settled after an earthquake on January 25, 1849, near Guam caused a tsunami that devastated Lamotrek and Satawal. It is possibly the name of the clan of a Carolinian chief, though the American administration relocated the Carolinians to Saipan in the early 1900s. The area was also called Maria Christina in the 19th century.

Economy

Beside the tourist district of Tumon, Tamuning is home to the Guam Premier Outlets, one of three major shopping centers of the island. United Airlines is headquartered in the old terminal building at Antonio B. Won Pat International Airport in Tamuning. United Airlines, with about 1,400 jobs, is Guam's largest single employer.

Demographics
The U.S. Census Bureau has the municipality in multiple census-designated places:
Tamuning,
Apotgan,
Harmon Industrial Park, Oka,
Tumon,
and Upper Tumon.

Infrastructure and government

Government of Guam
The Guam Department of Land Management and the Guam Economic Development Authority have their headquarters in the Guam International Trade Center (ITC) Building in Tamuning.

The Guam Power Authority has its headquarters in Harmon, Tamuning.

The Guam Department of Mental Health and Substance Abuse has its main facility in Tamuning, across from Guam Memorial Hospital.

U.S. federal government
The United States Postal Service operates the Tamuning Post Office at 143 Edward T. Calvo Memorial Parkway.

Climate 
Under the Köppen climate classification, Tamuning features a tropical rainforest climate.

Education

Primary and secondary schools

Public schools 
Guam Public School System serves the island.

Public schools serving Tamuning:
Chief Brodie Memorial Elementary School (Tamuning)
Lyndon B. Johnson Elementary School (Tamuning)
Tamuning Elementary School (Tamuning)
Jose L. G. Rios Middle School (Piti)
John F. Kennedy High School (Tamuning)

Private schools
St. John's School
Saint Anthony Catholic School

Diplomacy 

Five countries maintain consulates in Tamuning, four of which are located in the landmark Guam ITC building at 590 South Marine Corps Drive. They are:
  (Suite 613B, ITC Building)
  (Suite 604A, ITC Building)
  (Suite 615B, ITC Building)
  (Suite 601A, ITC Building)
  (125C Tun Jose Camacho Street)

Government

Notable people 
 

Reyn Johnson (born 1990), Guamanian international footballer

See also 

Villages of Guam

References

External links

 PEACE Project Profile on Tamuning

Villages in Guam